Allen Creek may refer to:

Canada
Allen Creek (Haliburton County), a stream in central Ontario

United States
Allen Creek (Elk Fork Salt River tributary), a stream in Missouri
Allen Creek (Scotland County, Missouri), a stream in Missouri
Allen Creek (Banister River tributary), a stream in Pittsylvania County, Virginia

See also
Allen Branch (disambiguation)